Surkhpur is a village located in Kapurthala district, Punjab, India, India. It is famous for kabaddi and has the best kabaddi players in the world.
Village is about 5km far from Beas River

References

Villages in Kapurthala district